An injury to one is an injury to all is a motto popularly used by the Industrial Workers of the World. In his autobiography, Bill Haywood credited David C. Coates with suggesting a labor slogan for the IWW: an injury to one is an injury to all. The slogan has since been used by a number of labor organizations. The slogan reflects the fact that the IWW is "One Big Union" and organizes skilled and unskilled workers.

Origin
The expression is similar to, and may be derived from, a slogan popularized in the prior quarter century by the Knights of Labor, 
"that is the best government in which an injury to one is the concern of all".

Gallery

See also
 Unus pro omnibus, omnes pro uno

References

External links

History of anarchism
Industrial Workers of the World culture
Socialism
Political catchphrases
Syndicalism